N'Garadougou  or N'Gara is a town and commune in the Cercle of Dioïla in the Koulikoro Region of south-western Mali. As of 1998 the commune had a population of 9,422.

References

Communes of Koulikoro Region